Podykh (Подих) (Breath) is the third studio album by Ukrainian recording artist Jamala. It was released on 12 October 2015 in Ukraine through Enjoy Records. The album includes the singles "Очима", "Шлях додому" and "Подих".

Singles
"Очима" was released as the lead single from the album on 26 March 2015. "Шлях додому" was released as the second single from the album on 18 May 2015. "Подих" was released as the third single from the album on 15 June 2015.

Track listing

Release history

References

External links
Official website

Jamala albums
2015 albums